Danby is the primary hamlet and a census-designated place (CDP) in the town of Danby, Tompkins County, New York, United States. It was first listed as a CDP prior to the 2020 census.

The community is in southern Tompkins County, in the north-central part of the town of Danby. It is in a valley at the headwaters of Buttermilk Creek, which flows north over Buttermilk Falls to Cayuga Inlet and then into Cayuga Lake at Ithaca.

New York State Route 96B runs through the center of Danby, leading north  to Ithaca and southeast  to Candor.

Demographics

References 

Census-designated places in Tompkins County, New York
Census-designated places in New York (state)